Ralf Seuntjens (born 17 April 1989) is a Dutch professional footballer who plays as a striker for Japanese club FC Imabari in J3 League.

Club career
Seuntjens formerly played for RBC Roosendaal, FC Den Bosch and Telstar. In April 2016, he was crowned the Eerste Divisie top goalscorer of the 2015–16 season with 28 goals.

On 11 March 2021, it was announced that Seuntjens had signed a two-year contract with an option for an additional year with NAC Breda, starting from the 2021–22 season.

On 25 March 2022, Seuntjens joined FC Imabari in the Japanese third-tier J3 League.

Personal life
His younger brother Mats Seuntjens is also a professional footballer.

On 12 May 2022, a neoplasm was discovered after a medical examination on Seuntjens' shoulder. On 17 June, he wrote on Instagram that he a diagnosis had been made, and that he was to undergo treatment.

Honours
VVV-Venlo
Eerste Divisie: 2016–17

Individual
Eerste Divisie top scorer: 2015–16

References

External links
 

1989 births
Living people
Footballers from Breda
Association football forwards
Dutch footballers
Eredivisie players
Eerste Divisie players
RBC Roosendaal players
FC Den Bosch players
SC Telstar players
VVV-Venlo players
De Graafschap players
NAC Breda players
FC Imabari players
Dutch expatriate footballers
Expatriate footballers in Japan
Dutch expatriate sportspeople in Japan